Morano is an Italian publishing house which was founded in Naples in 1849.

Established during a difficult period in the history of Naples, it performed an important role in the diffusion of culture, publishing the writings of Giambattista Vico, Adolfo Bartoli, Vincenzo Gioberti and, later, above all, those of Francesco de Sanctis and Luigi Settembrini.

The press, directed for a long period by the Neapolitan Antonio Morano (1899–1993), published series in the areas of philosophy, law, and school textbooks.

External links
 Official website

Sources
''This article originated as a translation of this version of its counterpart in the Italian Wikipedia.

Italian companies established in 1849
Publishing companies established in 1849
Book publishing companies of Italy
Mass media in Naples
Companies based in Naples